Nitronium perchlorate, NO2ClO4, also known as nitryl perchlorate and nitroxyl perchlorate, is an inorganic chemical, the salt of the perchlorate anion and the nitronium cation. It forms colorless monoclinic crystals. It is hygroscopic, and is a strong oxidizing and nitrating agent. It may become hypergolic in contact with organic materials. 

Nitronium perchlorate was investigated as an oxidizer in solid rocket propellants. Thomas N. Scortia filed for patent on such propellant in 1963. However its reactivity and incompatibility with many materials hindered such use. Coating of nitronium perchlorate particles with ammonium nitrate, prepared in situ by passing of dry ammonia gas over the particles, was investigated and a patent was awarded.

Decomposition rate of nitronium perchlorate can be altered by doping with multivalent cations.

Nitronium perchlorate and ammonium perchlorate do not produce smoke when stoichiometrically burned with non-metallic fuels. Potassium perchlorate and other metal perchlorates generate smoke as the metal chlorides are solid materials creating aerosols of their particles. Of all perchlorates, nitronium perchlorate is the most powerful oxidizer.  It can be easily detonated, however.

References

Nitronium compounds
Perchlorates
Pyrotechnic oxidizers
Rocket oxidizers
Oxidizing agents